Uri Lupolianski (born 1951) was mayor of Jerusalem from 2003 to 2008 and founder of Yad Sarah.

Biography
Born August 29, 1951 in Haifa, Israel, Lupolianski studied at the Yavne School in Haifa and then attended Yeshivat Hanegev and Yeshivat Torah Ore. He served in the Israel Defense Forces as a paramedic and worked as a teacher at a religious school in Jerusalem. Lupolianski is married to Michal Lupolianski (Schneller), granddaughter of Rabbi Isaac Breuer. They have 12 children.

Yad Sarah
In 1976, Lupolianski founded the Yad Sarah organization to help the elderly and disabled. The organization is named for his Polish grandmother, who was murdered in the Holocaust. It lends out medical equipment and supplies a variety of services to the sick, elderly and lonely. Yad Sarah has a network of 6,000 volunteers working out of 96 branches, and serves all sectors of the population.

Political career
Lupolianski was Deputy Mayor, chairperson of the Planning and Building Committee and responsible for the Family Services and Community portfolio. He was a member of the National Building and Planning Committee and the Committee for the Development of Holy Places. Lupolianski is a member of the Degel Hatorah party which ran for elections together with Agudat Israel in a united party called United Torah Judaism. In the 2003 Jerusalem mayoral election, Lupolianski ran under the United Torah Judaism ticket. This was part of a rotation deal which stated that in the next election, the ticket would nominate a candidate from Agudat Israel. He was elected on June 6, 2003, after serving on the Jerusalem City Council from 1989.

Mayoral term
To attract students to Jerusalem's institutions of higher education, Lupolianski inaugurated the "Lupolianski Package" which offers special tuition and housing subsidies to university students renting apartments in the city center. Hi-tech workers who choose to live and work in Jerusalem are also eligible for a monthly grant to cover part of their living expenses. Lupolianski was accused of preferring Jews for civil service over Arabs, and of basing municipal decisions on his religious views. During his tenure as mayor, Lupolianski clashed with the Israeli gay and lesbian community for trying to stop or change the venue of their annual Gay pride parade in Jerusalem.

Awards
Before becoming mayor, Lupolianski won the President's Volunteer Prize, the Knesset Speaker's Award and the Kaplan Prize for Efficiency. In 1994, he accepted the Israel Prize on behalf of Yad Sarah.

Holyland case

On January 5, 2011, he was indicted with 17 others for allegedly giving or receiving bribes to advance various real estate ventures, particularly the Holyland development. However, unlike the others in the case, Lupolianski never received any money himself. Rather, the money was sent to a Jerusalem charity that assists poor people in the city. In March 2014, he was found guilty of corruption.

References

1951 births
Living people
Degel HaTorah politicians
Deputy Mayors of Jerusalem
Israeli government officials convicted of crimes
Israeli Orthodox Jews
Israeli people convicted of bribery
Israeli politicians convicted of corruption
Mayors of Jerusalem
People from Haifa
Israeli politicians convicted of crimes
Date of birth missing (living people)